Tele Columbus  is a large cable provider in Germany with 3.6 million connected households on network level 4. The company was formed in November 2006 following the merger of Tele Columbus GmbH and ewt multimedia GmbH. In 2015, Tele Columbus acquired Primacom and Pepcom. In addition to analogue television, their range of products includes digital television, internet, and telephone via broadband. Besides its headquarter in Berlin the Company has locations in Hamburg, Leipzig, Ratingen, and Unterföhring (Munich). Since January 2015 Tele Columbus AG is traded on the regulated market (Prime Standard) of the Frankfurt Stock Exchange and since June 2015 listed in the SDAX.

References

Cable television companies
Cable television companies of Germany
Mass media companies established in 1985
Telecommunications companies established in 1985
1985 establishments in Germany